Kangri is an Indo-Aryan language spoken in northern India, predominantly in the Kangra, Una and few parts of Hamirpur of Himachal Pradesh as well as in some parts of the Gurdaspur, Rupnagar and Hoshiarpur districts of Punjab. It is associated with the people of the Kangra Valley. The total number of speakers has been estimated at  million as of 2011.

Like most of IA languages, Kangri does form a dialect continuum with its neighbouring languages. This includes the Pahari varieties spoken to the east Mandeali and Kullui, north to Chambeali, Gaddi & Bhateali & south-east to Kahluri. Besides it also share continuum north-west to Jammu Dogri and in south and west to Punjabi. It is currently classified under Western Pahari branch.

Kangri Language is on International Dashboard of Current UD Languages since May 2021. Only ten Indian languages are there on this dashboard and Kangri is one of them. Google has also introduced Kangri keyboard for typing now.

Script 
The native script of the language is Takri Script but now people write Kangri Language in Devanagari script.

Phonology

Consonants 

 It is not clear whether or not [j] is considered as a separate phoneme, but it does occur in various phonetic environments.
 [ɳ] is heard mostly as either an allophone of /ɽ̃/, and as /n/ before a retroflex stop.

Vowels 

 /e/ can also become lowered to a nasal [ɛ̃], after /ɽ̃/.

Tone 
Kangri is a tonal language like Punjabi or Dogri but the assignment of tones differs in Kangri when compared to them.

Most of the surrounding language varieties (including Kangri) lack voiced, aspirated obstruents (J. C. Sharma 2002, Masica 1993). Hindi cognate words which have a voiced, aspirated obstruent (or /h/) become tonal in these languages. Another difference to note between Kangri and Punjabi/Dogri is that these forms surface as voiced consonants in Kangri, but voiceless consonants in Punjabi/Dogri. That is, Kangri has lost the aspiration (in gaining tone), but Punjabi/Dogri has lost both aspiration and voicing. It is likely that these are separate innovations which originated in the West (Punjab or Jammu & Kashmir) and have spread outwards. The loss of aspiration (and gaining of tone) has been fully realized in all three languages, but the loss of voicing has not yet reached Kangri.

Grammar

Pronouns 
1st Person Singular : मैं /mæ̃/

1st Person Plural : असाँ, अहाँ /əsãː, əhãː/

2nd Person Singular : तू /tu/

2nd Person Plural : तुसाँ, त्वहाँ /t̪usãː, t̪vəhãː/

3rd Person Singular and Plural : सै /sæ/

Noun Cases 

Kangri - Hindi - English - Case
घर /kʱər/ (noun)
1. घर - घर - home - Nominative

2. घरे यो/जो - घर को - to home - Accusative
    
3.  घरैँ - घर ने - Ergative

‌4. घरेने  - घर के साथ - with house - Comitative

5. घरेते    - घर से   - through home  - Instrumental

6. घरेताँइ - घर के लिए   - for home       - Dative

7. घरेते    - घर से   - from home           - Ablative

8. घरे दा, दे, दि, दियाँ - घर का/की/के - of home - Genetive

Locatives

9. घरेच् - घर में - Innesive

10. घरे पर - घर पर - Addesive

Others

11. घर॑ - ओ घर - Vocative

12. घर देआ, दए, दइ, दीयाँ - घर सा/सी/से - Semblative

13. घरे साइ - घर जैसा - Similative

14. घरे तिक्कर् - घर तक - Terminative

Postpositional/Oblique forms -

Noun - Sin., Plu.

घर -  घरे, घरेयाँ

घड़ा - घड़े, घड़ेयाँ

नदी - नदिया, नदियाँ

घ्यो - घ्यो, घ्योआँ

Status 

The language is commonly clubbed as Pahari or Himachali. Some Dogri and Punjabi linguists have referred Kangri as part of their language due to similarities and decent mutual intelligibility between them. This is generally observed only in bordering lects due to dialect continuum present among many IA languages. Kangri writers & poets have been making submissions to Pahari language's cause under Himachal Pradesh Academy of Arts, Culture & Languages (HPAACL). The language has no official status. According to the United Nations Education, Scientific and Cultural Organisation (UNESCO), the language is of definitely endangered category, i.e. many Kangri children are not learning Kangri as their mother tongue any longer.

The demand for the inclusion of 'Western Pahari' under the Eight Schedule of the Constitution, which is supposed to represent multiple Pahari languages of Himachal Pradesh, had been made in the year 2010 by the state's Vidhan Sabha. There has been no positive progress on this matter since then even when small organisations are taking it upon themselves to save the language. Due to political interest, the language is currently recorded as a dialect of Hindi, even when having a poor mutual intelligibility with it.

References

Further reading

External links
 Singh, Amitjit.  "The Language Divide in Punjab." Sagar, Volume 4, Number 1, Spring 1997.
 Goldsmith, Parvin. "Scripture in Kangri recordings (mp3s)" 2007.

Languages of India
Northern Indo-Aryan languages
Languages of Himachal Pradesh
Kangra, Himachal Pradesh
Endangered languages of India
Tonal languages in non-tonal families